Indian Head Pond is a  pond in Hanson, Massachusetts. The pond is a tributary to Furnace Pond, a public water supply, and is the headwaters to Indian Head Brook.

External links
Environmental Protection Agency
South Shore Coastal Watersheds - Lake Assessments

Ponds of Plymouth County, Massachusetts
Ponds of Massachusetts